Q'illu Urqu (Quechua q'illu yellow, urqu mountain, "yellow mountain", Hispanicized spellings Jello Orjo, Quillo) is a  mountain in the Wansu mountain range in the Andes of Peru. It is situated in the Apurímac Region, Antabamba Province, Oropesa District, and in the  Arequipa Region, La Unión Province, on the border of the districts of Huaynacotas and Puyca District. Q'illu Urqu lies southeast of the mountains Wilaquta, Allqa Walusa and Taruja Marka.

References 

Mountains of Peru
Mountains of Apurímac Region
Mountains of Arequipa Region